Peter Albert Raftery, CVO, MBE (8 June 1929 – 10 June 1996) was  High Commissioner to Botswana from 1986 to 1989.

He was educated at St Ignatius' College, Enfield. After National Service he joined the CRO in 1949. He served in New Delhi, Cape Town, Kuala Lumpur Nairobi and  Bahrain. He was First Secretary at the FCO, Head of Chancery at Gaborone; Assistant Head at the East Africa Department then Counsellor and Consul General at Amman before his Botswana appointment.

References

People educated at St Ignatius' College, Enfield
High Commissioners of the United Kingdom to Botswana
1929 births
1996 deaths
Members of the Order of the British Empire
Commanders of the Royal Victorian Order